Duskin Creek is a stream in Cape Girardeau County in the U.S. state of Missouri.

Duskin Creek most likely has the name of a local family.

See also
List of rivers of Missouri

References

Rivers of Cape Girardeau County, Missouri
Rivers of Missouri